The Irondale Center for Theater, Education, and Outreach is a performance space in Brooklyn, New York. It was established in 2008 by the Irondale Ensemble Project in a space that had previously housed Sunday school classes for the Layfayette Church.

References 

Performing arts centers in New York City
Culture of Brooklyn
Fort Greene, Brooklyn